Radějovice is a municipality and village in Prague-East District in the Central Bohemian Region of the Czech Republic. It has about 500 inhabitants.

Administrative parts
The village of Olešky is an administrative part of Radějovice.

References

Villages in Prague-East District